Blason is a form of poetry. The term originally comes from the heraldic term "blazon" in French heraldry, which means either the codified description of a coat of arms or the coat of arms itself.

History

The term forms the root of the modern words "emblazon", which means to celebrate or adorn with heraldic markings, and "blazoner", one who emblazons. This form of poetry was used extensively by Elizabethan-era poets. The terms "blason", "blasonner", "blasonneur" were used in 16th-century French literature by poets who, following Clément Marot in 1536, practised a genre of poems that praised a woman by singling out different parts of her body and finding appropriate metaphors to compare them with. It is still being used with that meaning in literature and especially in poetry. One famous example of such a celebratory poem, ironically rejecting each proposed stock metaphor, is William Shakespeare's Sonnet 130:

My mistress' eyes are nothing like the sun;Coral is far more red than her lips' red;If snow be white, why then her breasts are dun;If hairs be wires, black wires grow on her head.I have seen roses damasked, red and white,But no such roses see I in her cheeks,And in some perfumes is there more delightThan in the breath that from my mistress reeks.

I love to hear her speak, yet well I know,That music hath a far more pleasing sound.I grant I never saw a goddess go;My mistress when she walks treads on the ground.And yet, by heaven, I think my love as rareAs any she belied with false compare.

Related phrases
Blason draws on Petrarchan conventions of representing the female beloved in Petrarch's Canzoniere of the 14th century. Petrarch never offers a complete picture of his beloved Laura, but depicts her only as parts of a woman. The French Blason tradition can also be considered anti-Petrarchan, as it moves away from the adulatory tone of the Petrarchan sonnet (Petrarchism was so pervasive in the Renaissance, it also included subversion of Petrarchan conventions). The term Blason populaire is a phrase in which one culture or ethnic group increases its own self-esteem by belittling others e.g. Samuel Johnson's description that "The noblest prospect which a Scotsman ever sees, is the high road that leads him to England!". This term originated from Alfred Canel's travelogue Blason Populaire de la Normandie (1859), in which people from Normandy boasted about themselves while sneering at other regions.

Related genres 
Other cultures have types of blason poetry. For instance, Ethiopia has a genre of poetry called Mälkəˀ, meaning "image" or "portrait,” generally written in the language of Gəˁəz in honor of sacred individuals. Such poems list and eulogize the spiritual powers of the saint, using the metaphor of various body parts, starting with the hair, eyelashes, tongue, and lips, moving down to the throat, breasts, and belly, and from there down to legs and toes, among other parts. For an example, see the poem Mälkəˀa Wälättä Ṗeṭros:  Hail to your back, which cast off luxurious cloaks,and to your chest, a banquet-table for the wretched.Walatta Petros, our mother, lover of fasting and prayer,request forgiveness for our sins before the Lord:Thus we implore you, we who are yours.

See also
Emblem book
Coat of arms
Blazon

References

French poetic forms